Hesar Khorvan (also Romanized as Ḩeşār Khorvān and Hesār Khorvān) is a village in Hesar Khorvan Rural District, Mohammadiyeh District, Alborz County, Qazvin Province, Iran. At the 2011 census, its population was 4,036, in 1,156 families. People of Hesar Khorvan are Tat and they speak Tati language.

References 

Populated places in Alborz County